Major General (Douglas) Ashton (Lofft) Wade CB OBE MC (13 March 1898 – 14 January 1996) was a British Army officer who commanded Malaya District after World War II.

Military career
Wade was commissioned into the Royal Garrison Artillery in 1916 and served in World War I in France and Belgium from 23 September 1916 to 20 December 1916 and in Italy from 20 September 1917 to 4 November 1918. He was wounded twice, awarded the Military Cross and was mentioned in despatches.

He transferred to Royal Corps of Signals in 1921. He attended the Staff College, Camberley from 1933 to 1934.

He served as Deputy Assistant Quartermaster General in Quetta in India from 1 January 1938 to 31 July 1939. He served in World War II as a General Staff Officer 1 with the British Expeditionary Force in France from 26 April 1940 to 30 June 1940 and took part in the Dunkirk evacuation in 1940. 
He was again appointed General Staff Officer 1 from 1 July 1940 to 15 May 1941.

He was mentioned in despatches for distinguished service in connection with operations in the field March in June 1940. He was appointed an Officer of the Order of the British Empire on 1 July 1941.

He continued his war service as assistant adjutant and quartermaster general for 2nd Division in Hull from 16 May 1941 to 3 October 1942. He was appointed deputy adjutant general and acting major-general 4 October 1942 in Simla and as commander of the Madras Area in India from 1944.

He was made General Officer Commanding Malaya District in 1947 and then became member of First and Second War Crimes Review of Sentences Boards for German, Italian and Japanese war criminals in 1948 (the second review included Field Marshal Erich von Manstein) before retiring in 1950.

In retirement he became telecommunications attaché in Washington D.C. and then senior planning engineer at the Independent Television Authority.

Family
In 1926 he married Heather Bulmer; they had one daughter. Following the death of his first wife he married Cynthia Halliday (née Allen) in 1972.

References

Bibliography

External links
Generals of World War II

1898 births
1996 deaths
British Army major generals
British Army personnel of World War I
British Army generals of World War II
Companions of the Order of the Bath
Officers of the Order of the British Empire
Recipients of the Military Cross
Royal Garrison Artillery officers
Royal Corps of Signals officers
Graduates of the Staff College, Camberley
People from Saffron Walden
Military personnel from Essex